You is the pinyin romanization of several Chinese family names including 尤 Yóu, 游 Yóu, 犹 Yóu, 由 Yóu, 右 Yòu, 幽 Yōu, etc. Among these names, 尤 Yóu and 游 Yóu are relatively common. 尤 Yóu is the 19th surname in Hundred Family Surnames. 

In Wade–Giles romanization system, You is spelled as Yu.

Notable people

Yóu 尤
It is the 19th name on the Hundred Family Surnames poem.

You Ching (born 1942), Taiwanese diplomat
You Quan (born 1954), Chinese politician, former Communist Party Secretary of Fujian province
You Yong (born 1963), Chinese actor
You Wenhui (born 1979), Chinese volleyball player
You Meihong (born 1993), Chinese swimmer
You Zhangjing (born 1994), Malaysian singer and songwriter, former member of Nine Percent
You Xiaodi (born 1996), Chinese tennis player
Yu Ming-shi, Administrative Deputy Minister of Coast Guard Administration of the Republic of China

Yóu 游
You Benchang (born 1933), Chinese actor
You Hwai-yin (born 1942), Taiwanese banker and Kuomintang politician 
Yu Shyi-kun (born 1948), Taiwanese Democratic Progressive Party politician
Yu An-shun (born 1967), Taiwanese actor
Chris Yu (born 1968, Taiwanese singer
Charles Yu (born 1976), American writer of Taiwanese descent
Martino Yu (born 1977), Taiwanese artist
Kelvin Yu (born 1979), American actor of Taiwanese descent

Yóu 由
You Xigui (born 1939), People's Liberation Army general
You Yuanwen (born 1986), Chinese football striker and midfielder

Other or unknown
Dominique You (1775–1830), French privateer
Lum You (1861–1902), Chinese man convicted of murder in the Pacific Northwest
You Hockry (born 1944), Cambodian politician
Carson Huey You (born 2002), American student, youngest person to ever receive a bachelor's degree from Texas Christian University
You Bo, Khmer writer

Chinese-language surnames

Multiple Chinese surnames